Queen o'Diamonds is a 1926 American silent drama film directed by Chester Withey and starring Evelyn Brent, Elsa Lorimer, and Phillips Smalley.

Plot
As described in a film magazine review, chorus girl Jerry Lyon resembles Jeanette Durant, a Broadway star whose husband is an international crook. Jerry, in love with struggling playwright Daniel Hammon, is induced to pose as Jeanette. She becomes involved in a series of wild adventures in which she innocently comes into possession of some stolen diamonds. She meets Ramsey, a theatrical producer, who agrees to star Jerry in Daniel's play, after she has brought the police in time to arrest a gang of desperate criminals.

Cast
 Evelyn Brent as Jeanette Durant / Jerry Lyon 
 Elsa Lorimer as Mrs. Ramsey 
 Phillips Smalley as Mr. Ramsey 
 William Bailey as LeRoy Phillips 
 Theodore von Eltz as Daniel Hammon
 Edward Peil as Crook

References

Bibliography
 Munden, Kenneth White. The American Film Institute Catalog of Motion Pictures Produced in the United States, Part 1. University of California Press, 1997.

External links

1926 films
1926 drama films
Silent American drama films
Films directed by Chester Withey
American silent feature films
1920s English-language films
Film Booking Offices of America films
American black-and-white films
1920s American films